Jaba Lipartia (born 16 November 1987) is a Georgian football coach and former player who is an assistant coach with Ukrainian club Zorya Luhansk.

Club career
He formerly played for FC Tbilisi and WIT Georgia.

He was released from his contract by FC Anzhi Makhachkala on 25 January 2018.

On 25 February 2018, he returned to Georgia, signing with FC Torpedo Kutaisi.

In 2019 he signed for Arsenal Kyiv. Later that month he signed for FC Buxoro.

References

External links
 
 Ukrainian Premier League player profile
 Zorya player profile
 

1987 births
Footballers from Tbilisi
Living people
Footballers from Georgia (country)
Association football midfielders
Georgia (country) under-21 international footballers
Georgia (country) international footballers
FC Tbilisi players
FC WIT Georgia players
FC Zorya Luhansk players
FC Anzhi Makhachkala players
FC Torpedo Kutaisi players
FC Samtredia players
FC Arsenal Kyiv players
Buxoro FK players
Erovnuli Liga players
Ukrainian Premier League players
Russian Premier League players
Uzbekistan Super League players
Expatriate footballers from Georgia (country)
Expatriate footballers in Ukraine
Expatriate sportspeople from Georgia (country) in Ukraine
Expatriate footballers in Russia
Expatriate sportspeople from Georgia (country) in Russia
Expatriate footballers in Uzbekistan
Expatriate sportspeople from Georgia (country) in Uzbekistan